The Caroline affair (also known as the Caroline case) was a diplomatic crisis involving the United States, the United Kingdom, and the Canadian independence movement, which lasted from 1837 to 1842. This modest military incident eventually acquired substantial international legal significance.

The affair began on December 28, 1837 when hundreds of Americans, who had been recruited by Canadian rebel leader William Lyon Mackenzie, encamped on Navy Island on the Canadian side of the Niagara River. They had been brought there, along with weapons, by the small American steamer Caroline, which had made several trips that day between Navy Island and Schlosser, N.Y. Late that night, armed men under British command crossed the Niagara River to board and capture the vessel where it was moored, at Schlosser's Landing in US territory. Shots were exchanged and two U.S. citizens, a watch-keeper and a cabin boy, were killed. British forces set fire to the Caroline and set it adrift in the Niagara River, about two miles above Niagara Falls. Sensationalized accounts of the affair were published by contemporary newspapers.

The burning outraged civilians on both sides of the US–Canadian border. In retaliation, a private militia composed of both US citizens and Canadians attacked a British vessel and destroyed it. During 1838, there were several other clashes pitting British forces against private militia. The diplomatic crisis was defused during the negotiations of several disputes U.S.-U.K. that led to the Webster-Ashburton Treaty in 1842. In the course of these negotiations both the U.S. and Britain made concessions concerning their conduct.

Correspondence about the incident between U.S. Secretary of State, Daniel Webster, and special minister to the United States, Alexander Baring, 1st Baron Ashburton, outlined the conditions under which one nation might lawfully violate the territorial sovereignty of another state. The Caroline test" (or Caroline Doctrine), as formulated by Webster's in response to British claims of necessity or self-defense, states that ". . . exceptions [to territorial inviolability] do exist [but] those exceptions should be confined to cases in which the necessity of that self-defense is instant, overwhelming, and leaving no choice of means, and no moment for deliberation".   

 According to scholars, the "Caroline test" remains an accepted part of international law today. For example, Tom Nichols (2008) has stated:

Background

The Reform Movement of Upper Canada (today's Ontario) was a movement to make the British colonial administration in Canada more democratic and less corrupt. William Lyon Mackenzie was one of the key leaders of this movement. He was repeatedly elected to serve in a hostile parliament that repeatedly ejected him for his reform efforts. By 1837, Mackenzie had given up on peaceful means for reform and began to prepare for an uprising.

In December 1837, Mackenzie began the Upper Canada Rebellion by fighting the British in the Battle of Montgomery's Tavern. His forces were seriously outnumbered and outgunned, and they were defeated in less than an hour. Mackenzie's allies suffered another major defeat a few days later in London. After these defeats, Mackenzie and his followers fled to Navy Island in the Niagara River, which they declared the Republic of Canada, on board the vessel SS Caroline.

Throughout these events, the Canadian rebels enjoyed widespread support from the Americans, who provided them supplies and bases from which to launch raids on the British.

Events

On December 29, 1837, while the Canadian rebels were on Navy Island, Canadian loyalist Colonel Sir Allan MacNab and Captain Andrew Drew of the Royal Navy commanding a party of militia, acting on information and guidance from Alexander McLeod that the vessel belonged to Mackenzie, crossed the international boundary and seized the Caroline. They chased off the crew, towed her into the current, set her afire, and cast her adrift over Niagara Falls. An African American watchmaker named Amos Durfee was shot and killed in the process, although who shot him and for what reason remain unknown. He was possibly accidentally shot by Alexander McLeod, a Scottish Canadian sheriff who had participated in the affair. The body of Durfee was later exhibited in front of a recruiting tavern in Buffalo, New York.

Minister H. S. Fox, in an 1841 letter to John Forsyth, summarized the British justification for the incursion:

The steamboat Caroline was a hostile vessel engaged in piratical war against her Majesty's people...it was under such circumstances, which it is to be hoped will never recur, that the vessel was attacked by a party of her Majesty's people, captured and destroyed.

New York's response:

US newspapers falsely reported "the death of twenty-two of her crew" when in fact, only Durfee was killed. Public opinion across the United States was outraged against the British. President Martin Van Buren protested strongly to London, but was ignored.

Aftermath: events
Shortly after the incident, a Canadian sheriff named Alexander McLeod claimed that he had helped attack the Caroline during the Caroline affair. McLeod was arrested in the United States in 1840 for his role in Durfee's death during the attack. This caused yet another international incident, as the British demanded his release, stating that he should not be held criminally responsible for following orders. The trial attempted to identify who exactly had shot Durfee, but this proved futile. McLeod was acquitted of all charges as witness statements made it clear that he had no involvement in the incident.

Many towns bordering Canada insisted that the United States enter a war with Britain because of this incident. The American government paused their prosecutions for violations of the neutrality law and President Martin Van Buren paused his campaign to restrain Patriots. Meanwhile, Canadians celebrated the incident and MacNab was knighted for his efforts. 

On May 29, 1838, 13 raiders, mostly Canadian and American refugees from the 1837 rebellion, led by American William "Pirate Bill" Johnston, retaliated by capturing, looting, and burning the British steamer Sir Robert Peel while she was in U.S. waters. President Martin Van Buren sent General Winfield Scott to prevent further incursions into Canada. However, there were several other attacks, the biggest being the Battle of the Windmill in November 1838.

Later that year, Irish-Canadian rebel Benjamin Lett murdered a loyalist, Captain Edgeworth Ussher, who had been involved in the Caroline affair.

Mackenzie published an account of the incident called The Caroline Almanack. He hoped the almanac would decrease American attitudes towards Canada.

Aftermath: diplomacy
Nearly five years after the raid, a new pair of negotiators were send to the diplomatic stage by their respective governments; U.S. Secretary of State Daniel Webster and Alexander Baring, 1st Baron Ashburton, U.K. politician and businessman at mercantile house Baring-Brothers & Co. This team was able to resolve the transatlantic friction and finally dispose the case, due to their great intellectual, diplomatic, and legal firepower, as one scholar did analyse. Their negotiations lead to the Webster–Ashburton Treaty of 1842. Secretary Webster admitted that the employment of force might have been justified by the necessity of self-defence, but denied that such necessity existed, while Lord Ashburton, although he maintained that the circumstances afforded excuse for what was done, apologized for the invasion of United States territory.

Anticipatory self-defense
This incident has been used to establish the principle of "anticipatory self-defense" in international politics, which holds that it may be justified only in cases in which the "necessity of that self-defense is instant, overwhelming, and leaving no choice of means, and no moment for deliberation". This formulation is part of the Caroline test. The Caroline affair is also now invoked frequently in the course of the dispute around preemptive strike (or preemption doctrine).

See also
 Timeline of United States diplomatic history
 Aroostook War, militias mobilized but no battles
 Pig War (1859), US–Britain border dispute in the Pacific Northwest

References

Further reading
 Craig Forcese; Destroying the Caroline The Frontier Raid That Reshaped the Right to War, Irwin Law Inc., 2018; 
Available at: https://scholarship.law.columbia.edu/faculty_scholarship/2507
 Matthew C. Waxman, The Caroline Affair in the Evolving International Law of Self-Defense, Columbia Public Law Research Paper No. 14-600 (2018). PDF available at: https://scholarship.law.columbia.edu
 Howard Jones; To the Webster-Ashburton Treaty: A Study in Anglo-American Relations, 1783-1843 University of North Carolina Press, 1977
 Kenneth R. Stevens; Border Diplomacy- The Caroline and McLeod Affairs in Anglo-American-Canadian Relations, 1837-1842 University of Alabama Press, 1989; 
 Wiltse, Charles M. "Daniel Webster and the British Experience." Proceedings of the Massachusetts Historical Society Vol. 85. (1973) pp 55-87  online.

External links
 
  The Avalon Project at Yale Law School: The Webster-Ashburton Treaty and The Caroline Case
Contemporary newspaper accounts of the Caroline Affair

History of the foreign relations of the United States
Canada–United States relations
Upper Canada Rebellion
1837 in international relations
Shipwrecks of the Saint Lawrence River
Pirate ships
United Kingdom–United States relations
Presidency of Martin Van Buren
Diplomatic incidents
Maritime incidents in December 1837
Maritime incidents in Canada
1837 in the United States